Gello may refer to:

Mythology
Gello, a female demon or revenant in Greek mythology

Places
Gello, Bibbiena, a village in the province of Arezzo, Italy
Gello, Montecatini Val di Cecina, a village in the province of Pisa, Italy
Gello, Palaia, a village in the province of Pisa, Italy
Gello, Pescaglia, a village in the province of Lucca, Italy
Gello, Pistoia, a village in the province of Pistoia, Italy
Gello, Pontedera, a village in the province of Pisa, Italy
Gello, San Giuliano Terme, a village in the province of Pisa, Italy
Gello Biscardo, a village in the province of Arezzo, Italy

Other uses
Gello Expression Language, a class-based object-oriented programming language